The eBox is a conversion of a Scion xB hatchback into a battery electric vehicle produced by the American company AC Propulsion.

History
AC Propulsion executives announced their intention to convert Scion  to battery electric vehicles in October, 2003.  Company executives stated that the Scion xB was chosen in part due to its boxy shape which allows for good placement and installation of a battery pack.  The availability of a suitable battery was said to be an important step in allowing for the announcement of the program.  Suitability requirements included that the battery be widely available ("off the shelf"), in volume, without danger that supply would be cut off or be overly limited.  Thousands of lithium-ion batteries, of the 18650 variant, were proposed as suitable for the rechargeable battery system.

The prototype eBox was unveiled in Santa Monica, California on August 18, 2006.  The prototype used a battery pack consisting of 5,300 Li-ion cells arranged into 100 blocks of 53 cells each.

The first production eBox was delivered to actor Tom Hanks on February 15, 2007.

Pricing
Estimated cost of this conversion exceeds US$50,000 in addition to the base vehicle cost (excluding the cost of the gasoline engine, that is replaced in the conversion), while high-volume OEM additional cost is projected at about $10,000. It appears that high-volume production by original vehicle manufacturers using AC production components is a goal, with the low-volume production being an intermediate step.

AC Propulsion offers the conversion for US$55,000.

Specifications
Acceleration: 0 to 60 mph in 7.0 seconds.
Top Speed: 
Range: 
 Motor:  AC induction motor
Battery pack: 5,088 Li-Ion cells, 355V nominal, 35kWh, 
Battery charger: On board, 100-250VAC, 50/60 Hz, includes Vehicle to Grid (V2G) and UPS (generator mode) capability
Charge rate: up to 20 kW; 30 minutes for 20–50 miles
Full Charge: 2 hours (fast), 5 hours (normal)
Energy Efficiency: 180 AC Wh/km in typical driving (648 kJ/km)

References

External links
 Company website
 Review and video gallery (Stefano Paris)
 Video of a test drive (Stefano Paris), Google Video format
 Pictures and notes from the company's October 2003 presentation (Electrifyingtimes.com)
 Informational article from August 2006 which provides updated information as to eBox price, quality, availability, company views. (EVWorld.com)

Automotive technologies
Production electric cars
Mini MPVs
Hatchbacks